Virginia's 68th House of Delegates district elects one of 100 seats in the Virginia House of Delegates, the lower house of the state's bicameral legislature. District 68, in Chesterfield County, Richmond, and Henrico County, Virginia, is represented by Democrat Dawn Adams.

From 2008 to 2018, the 68th district was represented by Republican Manoli Loupassi from 2008 to 2018. He lost his 2017 reelection bid to Adams by 325 votes (of more than 40,000 cast).

The 68th district is one of 11 House of Delegates districts that courts found unconstitutionally gerrymandered by race and are expected to be redrawn for the 2019 election. Under the redistricting plan drafted by political scientist Bernard Grofman, the 68th is expected to remain a swing district.

District officeholders

References

External links
 

Virginia House of Delegates districts
Government in Chesterfield County, Virginia
Richmond, Virginia
Government in Henrico County, Virginia